The 1988 Metro Conference men's basketball tournament was held March 11–13 at the Mid-South Coliseum in Memphis, Tennessee. 

Louisville defeated Memphis State in the championship game, 81–73, to win their sixth Metro men's basketball tournament.

The Cardinals, in turn, received a bid to the 1988 NCAA Tournament.

Format
All seven of the conference's members participated. They were seeded based on regular season conference records, with the top team earning a bye into the semifinal round. The other six teams entered into the preliminary first round.

Bracket

References

Metro Conference men's basketball tournament
Tournament
Metro Conference men's basketball tournament
Metro Conference men's basketball tournament